Bolton is a village and civil parish in the Eden District of Cumbria, England, about  north west of Appleby-in-Westmorland, and on the River Eden. According to the census of 2001, it had a population of 416, increasing to 435 at the census of 2011. The parish touches Brougham, Colby, Cliburn, Crackenthorpe, King's Meaburn, Kirkby Thore, Morland and Temple Sowerby.

Features 
There are 14 listed buildings in Bolton. Bolton has a pub called the New Crown Inn (formerly the Eden Vale Inn), two schools, a primary school called Bolton Primary School, a church called All Saints Church, and a priory school called Eden Grove School, which is now closed.

Crossrigg Hall is a Grade II* listed country house, designed by Anthony Salvin in 1864. Bewley Castle was a medieval residence of the bishops of Carlisle. There is a story told, that a castle servant named Marget Dawe once murdered a highwayman named Belted Will Scott, after he gained entrance to the castle dressed as a woman.

Location grid

History 
The name "Bolton" means 'Collection of buildings'. Bolton was a chapelry in Morland parish until 1866, when it became a separate civil parish.

References

External links 
 Cumbria County History Trust: Bolton (nb: provisional research only – see Talk page)

 
Villages in Cumbria
Civil parishes in Cumbria
Eden District